Elīna Ringa is the first official female pole-vaulter in Latvia and also the first Latvian female national record holder in this event. She won the Latvian National Championship competition outdoors and indoors more than ten times.

Elina Ringa was born in Riga,  the capital of Latvia, on 29 September, in 1980.

The first official record in Latvian athletics for female pole-vault was set by Elina at the Riga Championship in 1996, she vaulted at 2.60 m.

The national record was broken by Elina more than 15 times. Her last national record outdoor was 3.72 m, set in 2000 in Valmiera and indoor - 3,75 m, set in 2001 in Riga. And her all times personal best is 3,80 m, which she achieved in 2006th. 

She ended her active sporting career in 2009 after serious ACL injury with following surgery on take-off leg and recovery took a while.

Since summer 2022nd Elina participates in masters athletics competitions. She became bronze medalist at World Masters Athletics championship in Tampere, Finland with result 2,70 m and her best result in 2022 is 2,80 m.

Result progression
Elina set a new national record for pole-vault with a jump of 3.10 m in Riga, Latvia in 1996; her personal best at the time. In 1997, at Hyvinkää in Finland, she improved upon this by achieving 3.40 m, again setting the National Record.

In 2000, in Valmiera (a large town in the Vidzeme of Latvia), she vaulted to 3.72 , setting a new record there as well as improving upon her personal best. In 2006, in the same town, she achieved 3.80 m.

Personal bests in other events
Elina has also competed in other athletic events. In the high jump, her personal best is 1.70 m. In the long jump, she has achieved 5.85 m.

In sprint events, she has run 100 m in 12.4 seconds, and 60 m in 7.6 seconds.

Education 
Instead of attending the Latvian Academy of Sport Education, Elina chose University of Latvia and studied Education Sciences, then, Applied Computer Science. In 2012th she has successfully completed master's degree program in Computer Science (IT field) at Computing faculty.

Job 
Elina has a various work experience. She started as a Teacher of Sports for handicapped children, then she worked as a Teacher of Applied Computer Science and Trainer of Computer courses. A lot of time she worked in IT Support and as IT consultant. Then, she worked as a System Administrator, System Test Analyst, Project Manager and also as IT Solutions Architect. Currently Elina continues to work in IT field.

Publications 
Elina has written study materials about Microsoft Office applications 2000-2007, Windows 2000/XP, HTML/CSS, MOSS 2007 and others. Her book, "Microsoft Excel 2007. Strādāsim ātrāk, ērtāk un efektīvāk!" ("Let's work faster, easier and more efficiently!"), was published by Turiba. and bought by many Education institutions and bookstores.

References 
New link to worldathletics.org profile  https://www.worldathletics.org/athletes/latvia/elina-ringa-14290071

Latvian female pole vaulters
1980 births
University of Latvia alumni
Living people
Athletes from Riga